Knight Bachelor is the oldest and lowest-ranking form of knighthood in the British honours system; it is the rank granted to a man who has been knighted by the monarch but not inducted as a member of one of the organised orders of chivalry. Women are not knighted; in practice, the equivalent award for a woman is appointment as Dame Commander of the Order of the British Empire (founded in 1917).

In 1903, 58 people were appointed Knights Bachelor.

Knights Bachelor appointed in 1903 
Source: William A. Shaw, The Knights of England, vol. 2 (London: Sherratt and Hughes, 1906), pp. 414–417.

References 

Knights Bachelor
Lists of knights and dames
British honours system